Guang'an District is a district of the city of Guang'an, Sichuan province, China. It is one of two urban districts of the city.

Characteristics
It is renowned as the birthplace and former residence of Deng Xiaoping, widely regarded as the chief designer for modern Chinese economy since 1978.

References

External links
Official website of Guang'an District Government

Districts of Sichuan
Guang'an